Bramley railway station is a railway station on the Reading to Basingstoke Line in the village of Bramley, Hampshire, England. The line opened in 1848, but the station did not open until 1895.
There is a level crossing at the north end of the platforms.

Services

From Mondays to Saturdays there is a half-hourly stopping service northbound to Reading and southbound to Basingstoke. On Sundays there is an hourly service in each direction.

References

External links

Railway stations in Hampshire
DfT Category F2 stations
Railway stations in Great Britain opened in 1895
Former Great Western Railway stations
Railway stations served by Great Western Railway